"Looking For You" is a gospel song by Kirk Franklin from his 2005 album Hero.

The song contains a sample from "Haven't You Heard," which was written by Patrice Rushen, Charles Mims Jr, Sheree Brown, and Freddie Washington.

Chart performance
"Looking for You" became a crossover hit as it was popular with gospel, R&B, and pop audiences. The song reached number five on the R&B/Hip-Hop Songs chart, number 61 on the Billboard Hot 100, and number one on the Hot Gospel Songs chart in the United States, making it Kirk Franklin's most successful single to date.

Charts

Weekly charts

Year-end charts

Personnel
Shaun Martin, Chris Godbey, and Kirk Franklin - Drum Programming
Jerome Harmon, Shaun Martin, and Kirk Franklin - Keyboards
Shaun Martin and D.J. Ernest "Ernie G" Green - Minimoog
Chris Godbey - Tracking Engineer
Dave Pensado - Mixing Engineer

''*Note: Personnel listing from Hero album liner.

Awards

The song was nominated for a Dove Award for Urban Recorded Song of the Year at the 37th GMA Dove Awards.

External links
"Looking for You" lyrics on Yahoo! Music
Music video on Yahoo! Music

References

2005 singles
Music videos directed by Darren Grant
Kirk Franklin songs
Songs written by Kirk Franklin
Songs written by Patrice Rushen
2005 songs